AQURIA Co., Ltd. is a Japanese game developer based in Yokohama, Japan. The company is mainly engaged in software development of console games.

The company is known for developing Sword Art Online: Infinity Moment, Sword Art Online: Hollow Fragment and the sequel Sword Art Online: Hollow Realization based on the popular Japanese light novel series, Sword Art Online. They are also known for their development assistance in the mainline and portable titles of the Boku no Natsuyasumi series by Millennium Kitchen.

Games developed by Aquria

Nintendo DS

Nintendo 3DS

Nintendo Switch

PlayStation 2

PlayStation 3

PlayStation 4

PlayStation Portable

PlayStation Vita

Windows

Xbox One

References 

Video game companies of Japan
Companies based in Yokohama
Japanese companies established in 2002
Video game companies established in 2002
Video game development companies